Vollevannet is a freshwater lake in the municipality of Kristiansand in Agder county, Norway.  The  lies in the district of Gimlekollen in the borough of Lund, and the surrounding residential area is also called Vollevannet.  The lake lies along the European route E18 highway at the exit for the Vest-Agder Museum Kristiansand and Ålefjær (county road 452). Historically, the lake was used as a reservoir for the city's drinking water.  The lake is held back by two dams, and there is a small, sandy beach at the northeast end of the lake.  The lake has perch in it.

Historical events 
In February 1943, during the German occupation of Norway, two Russian prisoners of war accused of burglary as well as attempting to escape were executed at the end of the lake Vollevannet. The two Russians were buried in the same grave. At the end of the war, the bodies of all three were dug up and taken to the Kristiansand crematorium. A memorial cross marks their former graves.

References

Geography of Kristiansand
Lakes of Agder
Reservoirs in Norway